François Brottes (born 31 March 1956 in Valence, Drôme) was a member of the National Assembly of France.  He represented Isère's 5th constituency from 1997 to 2012 as a member of the Socialiste, radical, citoyen et divers gauche. Brottes also serves as the mayor of Crolles.  In 2012 he was appointed director of Réseau de Transport d'Électricité, and was replaced in the assembly by his substitute, Pierre Rebeaud.

References

1956 births
Living people
People from Valence, Drôme
Socialist Party (France) politicians
Mayors of places in Auvergne-Rhône-Alpes
Radio France people
Deputies of the 12th National Assembly of the French Fifth Republic
Deputies of the 13th National Assembly of the French Fifth Republic
Deputies of the 14th National Assembly of the French Fifth Republic